Grace is a female given name from the Latin gratia. It is often given in reference to the Christian concept of divine grace and used as a virtue name.

Variants
French: Grâce
English: Gracie
Albanian: Greis, Graciela
Irish: Gráinne
Italian: Grazia, Graziella
Latin: Gratia
Polish: Gracja
Portuguese: Graça, Gracília
Scottish Gaelic: Gràinne
Spanish: Gracia, Graciela
Basque: Garazi
Bulgarian: Грация

Notable people

A
 Grace Abbott (1878–1939), American social worker
 Grace Aguilar (1816–1847), English novelist and writer on Jewish history and religion
 Grace Akallo (21st century), Ugandan child soldier
 Grace Akello (born c. 1940), Ugandan poet, essayist, folklorist and politician
 Grace Albee (1890–1985), American printmaker and wood engraver
 Grace Alekhine (1876–1956), American-British-French female artist and chess master
 Grace Alele-Williams (born 1932), Nigerian mathematician and university vice-chancellor
 Grace Greenwood Ames (1905–1979), American artist who worked predominantly in Mexico
 Grace Andreacchi (born 1954), American-born author
 Grace Andrews (mathematician) (1869–1951), American mathematician
 Grace Apiafi (born 1958), Nigerian shot putter and discus thrower
 Grace Arnold (1899–1979), English actress
 Grace Ayensu, Ghanaian politician

B
 Mary Grace Baloyo (died 2001), First Lieutenant in the Philippine Air Force
 Grace Bannister (1924–1986), Unionist politician in Northern Ireland
 Grace Bardsley (1920–1972), Australian Aboriginal rights activist and political activist
 Grace Barnsley (1896–1975), English pottery decorator
 Grace Bauer, American poet
 Grace Bawden (born 1992), Australian classical crossover singer
 Grace Bedell (1848–1936), American woman who influenced Abraham Lincoln to grow his famous beard
 Grace Benham (1876–1968), American silent film actress
 Grace Folashade Bent (born 1960), Nigerian politician
 Grace Bilger (1907–2000), American artist
 Grace Birungi (born 1973), Ugandan runner
 Grace Lee Boggs (1915–2015), Chinese-American author, social activist and feminist
 Grace Bowman (equestrian) (born 1990), Australian Paralympic equestrian
 Grace Duffie Boylan (1861?–1935), American writer
 Grace Bradley (1913–2010), American film actress
 Grace Brown (1886–1906), American skirt factory worker who was murdered
 Grace Brown (born 1992), Australian cyclist
 Grace Mann Brown (1859–1925), American writer and spiritual leader
 Grace Bumbry (born 1937), American opera singer
Grace Burbridge (born 1887), British suffragette, burned whilst setting fire to a postbox
 Grace Bussell (1860–1935), Australian heroine, involved in the rescue of the SS Georgette
 Grace Butler (née Cumming, 1886–1962), New Zealand artist

C
 Grace Carlson (1906–1992), American communist politician
 Grace Carter (born 1989), British volleyball player
 Grace Cassidy (born 1993), English actress
 Grace Cavalieri (born 1932), American poet, playwright and broadcaster
 Grace Chan (born 1991), Canadian actress, television host, and beauty pageant titleholder
 Grace Chang (born 1933), Chinese actress and singer
 Grace Chia, Singaporean writer, poet, journalist and editor
 Grace Zia Chu (1899–1999), American author of Chinese cookbooks
 Grace Clements (artist) (1905–1969), American artist
 Grace Clements (athlete) (born 1984), English heptathlete
 Grace Stone Coates (1881–1976), American writer
 Grace Coddington (born 1941), British former model and creative director of American Vogue magazine
 Grace Colman (1892–1971), British politician
 Grace Comiskey (–1956), American owner of the Chicago White Sox
 Grace Conkling (1878–1958), American writer
 Grace Corbett (–1843), Scottish author and poet
 Grace Coolidge (1879–1957), First Lady of the United States; wife of President Calvin Coolidge
 Grace Inez Crawford (1889–1977), Paris-born England-based American singer, actress, costume designer, translator of plays and writer
 Grace Noll Crowell (1877–1969), American poet
 Grace Crowley (1890–1979), Australian artist
 Grace Cunard (1893–1967), American actress, screenwriter and film director
 Grace Curzon, Marchioness Curzon of Kedleston (1879–1958), American socialite

D
 Grace Daley (born 1978), American professional women's basketball player
 Grace Darling (1815–1842), Northumbrian Victorian heroine
 Grace Darmond (1893–1963), Canadian-born American actress
 Grace Montañez Davis (born 1926), Mexican-American political activist and deputy mayor of Los Angeles
 Grace Davison, American silent-movie actress
 Grace de Laguna (1878–1978), American philosopher and academic
 Grace Deeb (born 1975), Lebanese singer
 Grace DeMoss (born 1927), American amateur golfer
 Grace Dent (born 1973), English journalist, author and broadcaster
 Grace Diaz (born 1957), Dominican-American politician
 Grace Hoadley Dodge (1856–1914), American philanthropist
 Grace A. Dow (1869–1953), American philanthropist
 Grace L. Drake, American politician
 Grace Drayton (1877–1936), American comics artist
 Grace Marguerite Hay Drummond-Hay (1895–1946), British journalist and aviation pioneer
 Grace Dunham (born 1992), American poet and actress

E
 Grace Ekpiwhre (born 1949), Nigerian civil servant
 Grace Elliott (1758–1823), Scottish socialite and courtesan

F
 Grace Fernald (1879–1950), American educational psychologist
 Grace Flandrau (1886–1971), American writer
 Grace Fong, American musician and academic
 Grace Fortescue (1883–1979), American socialite
 Grace Frankland (1858–1946), English microbiologist
 Grace Voss Frederick (1905–2009), American actress and museum curator
 Grace Beacham Freeman (1916–2002), American poet, columnist, short story writer and educator
 Grace Fu (born 1964), Singaporean politician
 Grace Fulton (born 1996), American actress

G
 Grace Gao (born 1989), Canadian badminton player
 Grace Garland, American singer-songwriter and actress
Grace Gassette (1871–1955), American artist and sculptor
 Grace George (1879–1961), American stage actress
 Grace Gibson (1905–1989), American radio producer who worked predominantly in Australia
 Grace Gifford (1888–1955), Irish artist and cartoonist
 Grace Gill-McGrath (born 1989), Australian soccer player
 Grace Glowicki, Canadian actress and filmmaker
 Grace Golden (1904–1993), English illustrator and historian
 Grace Goodell, American anthropologist dddads
 Grace Grace (born 1958), Australian politician
 Grace Winifred Green (1907–1976), New Zealand radio broadcaster and journalist
 Grace Gregory (1901–1985), American film set decorator
 Grace Griffith, American folk and Celtic singer
 Grace Groner (1909–2010), American philanthropist
 Grace Gummer (born 1986), American actress

H
 Grace Eleanor Hadow (1875–1940), English author and academic
 Grace Halsell (1923–2000), American journalist and writer
 Grace Towns Hamilton (1907–1992), African-American politician
 Grace Hanagan (1906–1995), Canadian survivor of the sinking of the Empress of Ireland (1914)
 Grace Hartigan (1922–2008), American abstract expressionist painter
 Grace Hartman (actress) (1907–1955), American stage and musical theater actress
 Grace Hartman (politician) (1900–1998), Canadian social activist and politician
 Grace Hartman (trade unionist) (1918–1993), Canadian labour union activist
 Grace Raymond Hebard (1861–1936), American historian, suffragist, writer and political economist
 Grace Helbig (born 1985), American comedian
 Grace Henderson (1860–1944), American stage and silent-film actress
 Grace Hightower (born 1955), American philanthropist, actress and singer
 Grace Livingston Hill (1865–1947), American novelist
 Grace Webster Haddock Hinsdale (1832–1902), American author
 Grace Hirst (1805–1901), New Zealand businesswoman, farmer, nurse and midwife
 Grace Hopper (1906–1992), American computer scientist 
 Grace Huang (born 1983), Australian actress
 Grace Hudson (1865–1937), American painter

I
 Grace Ingalls (1877–1941), American journalist and youngest sister of novelist Laura Ingalls Wilder

J
 Grace Jackson (born 1961), Jamaican athlete
 Grace James (1864–1930), British writer of children's literature
 Grace Jantzen (1948–2006), Canadian feminist philosopher and theologian
 Grace Jane Joel (1865–1924), New Zealand artist
 Grace Mott Johnson (1882–1967), American artist
 Grace Jones (born 1948), Jamaican-born singer, actress and model
 Grace Jordan (1892–1985), American writer and journalist

K
 Grace Kamaikui (1808–1866), Hawaiian high chief
 Grace Kaufman (born 2002), American actress
 Grace Keagy (1921–2009), American actress
 Grace Kelly (1929–1982), American actress who became Princess Grace of Monaco
 Grace Kelly (musician) (born 1992), American musician
 Grace Kennedy (writer) (1782–1825), Scottish writer
 Grace Kennedy (singer) (born 1958), British singer and television presenter
 Grace Ji-Sun Kim (born 1969), Korean-American theologian and professor
 Grace Kimmins (1871–1954), British philanthropist
 Grace King (1852–1932), American writer
 Grace Kirby, English film and television actress
 Grace Knight (born 1955), English-born Australian musician
 Grace F. Knoche (1909–2006), American Theosophist, leader of the Theosophical Society
 Grace Anne Dorney Koppel, American lawyer and health activist
 Grace Krilanovich (born 1979), American writer
 Grace Lynn Kung (born 1987), Canadian actress

L
 Grace La Rue (1882–1956), American actress, singer, and Vaudeville performer
 Grace Lau (born 1991), Hong Kong karateka
 Grace Lee (born 1982), Korean television host and radio disc jockey
 Grace Etsuko Lee, Japanese-born American author, speaker, trainer, international business woman
 Grace Lin, American children's author, and illustrator
 Grace Denio Litchfield (1849–1944), American novelist, poet 
 Grace Llewellyn (born 1964), American educator, author and publisher
 Grace Annie Lockhart (1855–1916), Canadian, first woman in the British Empire to receive a bachelor's degree
 Grace Loh (born 1991), Australian swimming champion
 Grace Lorch (c. 1903–1974), American teacher and civil rights activist
 Grace Lumpkin (1891–1980), American writer

M
 Grace Maccarone, children's book editor and author
 Grace MacInnis (1905–1991), Canadian politician and feminist
 Grace Madden (1911–1987), American pair skater
 Grace, Lady Manners, English noblewoman, founder of Lady Manners School in 1636
 Grace Marks (c. 1828–after c. 1873), Irish-Canadian convicted murderer, subsequently pardoned
 Grace Marra (born 1959), American musician
 Grace McCallum (born 2002), American artistic gymnast
 Grace McCarthy (born 1927), Canadian politician
 Grace McCleen (born 1981), British writer
 Grace McDaniels (1888–1958), American freak show star
 Grace McDonald (1918–1999), American actress
 Grace McKeaney, American television writer, playwright and educator
 Grace McKenzie (1903–1988), English swimmer
 Grace Meng (born 1975), American lawyer and politician
 Grace Metalious (1924–1964), American author of Peyton Place
 Grace Mildmay (c. 1552–1620), English noblewoman, diarist and medical practitioner
 Grace Millane (1996–2018), murdered English tourist
 Grace Min (born 1994), American tennis player
 Grace Mirabella (1930–2021), American journalist
 Grace Mera Molisa (1946–2002), Vanuatuan politician, poet and campaigner for women's equality in politics
 Grace Momanyi (born 1981), Kenyan long-distance runner
 Grace Moore (1898–1947), American operatic soprano and actress
 Chloë-Grace Moretz (born 1997), American actress
 Grace Morgan (1909–1996), English cricketer
 Grace Morley (1900–1985), American museologist who founded museums in San Francisco and New Delhi
 Grace Mugabe (born 1965), wife of Zimbabwe President Robert Mugabe
 Grace Mukomberanwa (born 1944), Zimbabwean sculptor

N
 Grace Napolitano (born 1936), American politician
 Grace Natalie (born 1982), Indonesian politician 
 Grace Nichols (born 1950), Guyanese poet
 Grace Nicholson (1877–1948), American art collector and art dealer
 Grace Nikae, Japanese-born American classical pianist
 Grace Nono (born 1965), Filipino singer

O
 Grace O'Malley (c. 1530–c. 1603), Irish chieftain and pirate
 Grace Ogot (born 1934), Kenyan author, nurse, journalist, politician and diplomat
 Grace Atkinson Oliver (1844–1899), American author, advocate of women's rights

P
 Grace Padaca (born 1963), Filipino politician
 Grace Paley (1922–2007), American short story writer, poet, teacher, and political activist
 Grace Park (actress) (born 1974), American-born Canadian actress
 Grace Park (golfer) (born 1979), South Korean professional golfer
 Grace Parra, American screenwriter, presenter, and actress
 Grace Perry (1927–1987), Australian poet, editor and pediatrician
 Grace Phipps (born 1992), American actress
 Grace Evelyn Pickford (1902–1986), English-born American biologist and endocrinologist
 Grace Poe (born 1968), Filipino politician
 Grace Portolesi (born 1968), Australian politician
 Grace Potter (born 1983), American lead singer of rock band Grace Potter and the Nocturnals

R
 Grace Rasmussen (born 1988), New Zealand netball player
 Grace Renzi (1922–2011), American artist
 Grace Rhys (1865–1929), Irish writer
 Grace S. Richmond (1866–1959), American writer
 Grace Robertson (born 1930), Scottish photographer
 Grace Rohrer (1924–2011), American educator, arts and women's rights activist and politician
 Grace Rolek (born 1997), American actress
 Grace Alexandra Rood (1893–1981), New Zealand school dental nurse
 Grace Roosevelt (1867–1945), American tennis player
 Grace Ross (born 1961), American environmental activist

S
 Grace Sandhouse (1896–1940), American entomologist
 Grace Berg Schaible (1925–2017), American lawyer, the first female state's attorney general
 Grace Schulman (born 1935), American poet and academic
 Grace Carew Sheldon (1855–1921), American journalist, author, editor, businesswoman
 Grace Sherwood (died 1740), American woman convicted of witchcraft in the U.S. state of Virginia in 1705–1706
 Grace Slick (born 1939), American rock vocalist
 Grace Cossington Smith (1892–1984), Australian artist
 Grace Snyder (1882–1982), American quilter, pioneer and centenarian
 Gracie Spinks (died 2021), English lifeguard believed to have been murdered
 Grace Stafford (1903–1992), American actress
 Grace Stanke (born 2002), American beauty pageant titleholder
 Grace Zaring Stone (1891–1991), American novelist and short story writer
 Grace Stratton (born 1999), New Zealand blogger and fashion entrepreneur
 Grace Sulzberger (born 1988), Australian cyclist

T
 Grace Tame (born 1994), Australian activist and sexual assault survivor advocate
 Grace Tanamal (born 1957), Dutch politician
 Grace Taylor (gymnast) (born 1988), American gymnast
 Grace Dyer Taylor (1859–1867), English Christian missionary in China
 Grace Paine Terzian (born 1952), American political writer and publishing executive
 Grace Thompson (born 1891), American silent film actress
 Grace Tsutada (born 1942), Japanese teacher and missionary
 Grace Tully (1900–1984), American presidential private secretary (to Franklin D. Roosevelt)

U
 Grace Upshaw (born 1975), American track and field athlete

V
 Grace Valentine (1884–1964), American actress
 Grace Van Studdiford (1873–1927), American opera singer and actress
 Grace Vanderbilt (1870–1953), American socialite
 Grace VanderWaal (born 2004), American singer-songwriter

W
 Grace Wahba (born 1934), American statistician and academic
 Grace Wahu (c. 1907–2007), first wife of Jomo Kenyatta, the first president of Kenya
 Grace Jane Wallace (died 1878), Scottish author and translator
 Grace Wanjiru (born 1979), Kenyan race walker
 Grace Miller White (1868–1957), American author
 Grace Lee Whitney (born 1930), American actress and entertainer
 Grace Widdowson (1892–1989), New Zealand nurse and hospital matron
 Grace Olive Wiley (1883–1948), American herpetologist
 Grace Williams (1906–1977), Welsh composer
 Grace Wilson (1879–1957), Australian high-ranked army nurse during World War I and World War II
 Grace Wong (born 1986), Hong Kong-born actress
 Grace Woodward (born 1978), English fashion stylist and television presenter
 Grace Wyndham Goldie (1900–1986), British pioneer television producer

Y
 Grace Chisholm Young (1868–1944), English mathematician
 Grace Young, Canadian-born American singer, songwriter musician known as Grace
 Grace Sari Ysidora (born 1995), Indonesian professional tennis player

Z
 Grace Zabriskie (born 1941), American actress

Pseudonyms
 "Grace Greenwood", pseudonym of Sara Jane Lippincott (1823–1904), American writer
 "Grace", alias of the underaged sole survivor of the 2008 Yishun triple murders case from Singapore

Fictional characters
 Grace Adler, in the television comedy series Will and Grace
 Grace Archer (1930–1955), in the BBC's long-running radio drama serial The Archers
 Grace Augustine, scientist in the film Avatar
 Grace Balin, the first DC Comics supervillainess known as Orca
 DCI Grace Barraclough, in the ITV1 soap opera Emmerdale
 Grace Beauchamp, in the BBC One drama series Holby City
 Grace Bennett, in the film Monte Carlo
 Grace Bowman, in American television series The Secret Life of the American Teenager
 Grace Cavendish, detective and the central character in the Lady Grace Mysteries
 Grace Choi, in the DC Comics universe
 Grace Florrick, daughter of Alicia Florrick in the American television series The Good Wife
 Grace Hamilton, in the movie The Godfather Part III
 Grace Harlowe, the protagonist of four series of books for girls by Jessie Graham Flower
 Grace Holloway, in the 1996 television movie Doctor Who
 Grace Kingston, in the Australian drama series McLeod's Daughters
 Grace Margaret Mulligan, lead character in the films Dogville and Manderlay
 Grace Monroe, the main character in Book Three (and a minor character in Book Two) of the animated anthology series Infinity Train
 Grace Nakimura, in the adventure game series Gabriel Knight
 Grace Santiago, in the American television series Nip/Tuck
 Grace Santos, in the film The 24 Hour Woman
 Grace Santos, in the Filipino TV series Aso ni San Roque
 Grace Sheffield, in the American TV series The Nanny
 Grace (Soulfire), in the comic book Soulfire
 Grace Stamper, in the 1998 film Armageddon
 Grace Turner, in the soap opera The Young and the Restless
 Grace Van Owen, in the TV series LA Law
 Grace Van Pelt, in the TV series The Mentalist
 Grace, an animal character in the Disney film Home on the Range
 Grace, a character in the Netflix series  Grand Army
 Grace the Glitter Fairy, in the book franchise Rainbow Magic
 Grace, a hunter in the video game Identity V

References

See also
 Ti-Grace Atkinson (born 1938), American feminist author
 Grace-Ann Dinkins (born 1966), American track and field athlete

Virtue names
English feminine given names
Feminine given names